Wélton Araújo Melo (born April 17, 1975 in Cambuci, Rio de Janeiro) is a former Brazilian footballer who played professionally as either a forward or midfielder in South America, Europe and the United States, including five season in Major League Soccer.

Club career
In 1994, Welton began his professional career with Fluminense. In 1996, Major League Soccer invited him to a tryout where he was offered an MLS contract. The league then assigned him to the New England Revolution, where he was a 1996 MLS All Star. On March 10, 1997, New England traded Welton to the Los Angeles Galaxy for the Galaxy's first round pick in the 1998 MLS Supplemental Draft.  On June 1, 1999, the Galaxy traded Welton to the MetroStars in exchange for Roy Myers.  Later that day, the MetroStars sent Welton, Eric Wynalda and Arley Palacios to the Miami Fusion.  In April 2001, Welton moved to the Pittsburgh Riverhounds of the USL A-League.  In 2002, he played for Paraná and in 2003, he was with and Fredrikstad FK in Norway.   On April 4, 2004, Welton moved to the  Seattle Sounders of the USL First Division.

Melo currently resides in the Seattle area and plays on a local team.

International career
Welton played once for the Brazil youth team at the 1995 Pan American Games, against Bermuda.

Honors

Individual
MLS All-Star: 1996

References

External links
CBF  
Profile at seattlesounders

1975 births
Living people
Brazilian footballers
Brazilian expatriate footballers
Fluminense FC players
CR Flamengo footballers
America Football Club (RJ) players
New England Revolution players
LA Galaxy players
Miami Fusion players
Pittsburgh Riverhounds SC players
Paraná Clube players
Seattle Sounders (1994–2008) players
Norwegian First Division players
USL First Division players
Major League Soccer players
Fredrikstad FK players
Expatriate footballers in Norway
Expatriate soccer players in the United States
Sportspeople from Rio de Janeiro (state)
Major League Soccer All-Stars
Brazil youth international footballers
A-League (1995–2004) players
New England Revolution draft picks
Association football midfielders
Association football forwards